The Journal of Applied Biomechanics is a bimonthly peer-reviewed academic journal and an official journal of the International Society of Biomechanics. It covers research on musculoskeletal and neuromuscular biomechanics in human movement, sport, and rehabilitation.

Abstracting and indexing 
The journal is abstracted and indexed in Compendex, CINAHL, Science Citation Index Expanded, Current Contents/Clinical Medicine, Index Medicus/MEDLINE/PubMed, Embase, and Scopus.

References

External links 
 

Biotechnology journals
Biomechanics
Bimonthly journals
English-language journals
Publications established in 1985
Academic journals published by learned and professional societies
Biomedical engineering journals